Zoltán Agócs (24 April 1938 Fiľakovo, Czechoslovakia – 14 February 2018, Senec, Slovakia) was an architect and professor from Czechoslovakia with Hungarian ancestry.

Biography
He matriculated in Lučenec at the Building Trade High School in 1957. He finished his master's degree as an architect in 1962 at the Architectural Department of Slovak University of Technology in Bratislava  After finishing his studies at the university, he started to teach there. From 1982 he became an associate professor; from 1990 he was a professor. He was senior lecturer and from 1994 to 2000 he was the vice-dean of Architectural Department. He wrote several course books and monographies. He was the member of several scientific groups, from 1998 he was the honorary professor of Technical University of Timișoara.

Works
As a researcher he worked with the structure of ropes, questions regarding theoretical and structural fields. Other field of his work was the architectural usage of steel structures. He took part planning of several bridges in Czechoslovakia and Hungary. He was one of the patrones of the reconstruction Mária Valéria Bridge connecting Štúrovo and Esztergom.

His most recognised work was the planning of Apollo Bridge of Bratisaval.

Books
 Torsion of Steel Beams (Together with: Iványi M., Balázs I., 1990) 
 Diagnostikovanie a rekonštrukcia oceľových konštrukcií (together with: J. Brodniansky, J. Vielan, 2004)

Honours
Ányos Jedlik Prize (2000) 
Ľudovít Štúr Prize degree III. (2000) 
Prize for Hungarian Art (2002)
Saint Gorazd Great Memorial Placket (2003)

Sources
Szlovákiai Magyar Adatbank
Elhuny Agócs Zoltán professzor, hirek.sk

Further information
Miroslav Maťaščík, Agócs Zoltán: Apollo, a pozsonyi új Duna-híd,  Magyar Tudomány, 2008/04 429. o.

1938 births
2018 deaths
Hungarians in Slovakia
People from Fiľakovo
Hungarian architects
Slovak University of Technology in Bratislava alumni